Acanthesthes crispa is a species of beetle in the family Cerambycidae. It was described by Olivier in 1792. It is known from South Africa and Mozambique.

Its junior synonym A. carinata's type locality is Grahamstown, South Africa and its initial description recorded its length as 22 mm and its width as 11 mm.

References

Phantasini
Beetles described in 1792